Audie James Norris (born December 18, 1960) is an American retired professional basketball player and coach. Norris played for the NBA's Portland Trail Blazers, from 1982 to 1985. His former teammate Mychal Thompson, who is the father of Klay Thompson, gave him the nickname "The Atomic Dog", because of his brutal in-game dunks.

After retiring from playing professional basketball in 1994, Norris has spent his time coaching and developing the skills of young student athletes. With more than 10 years as a consultant to European basketball teams, he has over 18 years of basketball coaching experience, on several levels of competition, from the cadet level, to semi-pro men's leagues. He is a certified Spanish Basketball Federation (FEB) Basketball Superior Coach, and a member of the Spanish Basketball Coaches Association, AEEB.

Norris was also named an NBA Ambassador, by the league's commissioner Adam Silver, and he has participated in the NBA Ambassador programs, with Jr. NBA and NBA Cares. His brother Sylvester Norris was also a player for the NBA's San Antonio Spurs.

College career
Norris played college basketball at Jackson State University, with the Tigers, from 1978 to 1982, while he studied Therapeutic Recreation and Special Education. During his time at Jackson State, he accumulated numerous accolades during those 4 years. He was named Freshman of the Year, and was a two-time league MVP.

He was inducted into the Jackson State University Athletics Hall of Fame in 1998.

Professional career
Norris was selected by the Portland Trail Blazers in the second round of the 1982 NBA draft with the 37th overall pick of the draft. In three seasons with the Trail Blazers in the NBA, he averaged 4.4 points, 3.1 rebounds, and 0.8 assists per game. After that, Norris moved to Europe, to continue playing professional basketball.

After he left the NBA, Norris spent the two seasons playing in the Italian League, with Benetton Treviso. He was an Italian League All-Star in 1986.

He then spent the next six seasons of his career in the Spanish League with FC Barcelona. While with Barcelona, Norris played on one of the best teams in Europe at that time. Some of his teammates with the club included "Epi", Nacho Solozábal, Andrés Jiménez, and Chicho Sibilio.

With Barcelona, Norris won three Spanish League championships (1988, 1989, and 1990), two Spanish King's Cup titles (1988 and 1991), the Spanish Super Cup title (1987), the second-tier Spanish Prince's Cup title (1988), and the Catalan League title (1989). With Barcelona, he also played in three straight EuroLeague Final Fours (1989, 1990, and 1991), where he also made the EuroLeague Finals in consecutive years (1990 and 1991). He was a two-time Spanish League All-Star (1988 and 1990), and he was also voted to the 1991 EuroLeague All-Final Four Team.

Norris finished his club career playing in the Greek League. He played with Peristeri Athens, during the 1993–94 season. In total, Norris played 12 seasons as a professional basketball player.

Coaching career
During his basketball coaching career, Norris has served as an assistant coach for the Jackson State Tigers, head coach of the Saint Joseph Catholic High School girls basketball team, assistant basketball coach of the Tougaloo College girls basketball team, head coach of the Jackson State Lady Tigers, assistant coach of the Jackson Rage Pro team, head coach at Genesis One Christian Prep School, and head coach of the New Horizon Preparatory School. He has also had coaching appearances with the National Basketball Association, Top 100 Camp, Uariachi Hoop Camp, 5-Star Basketball Camp, Mo Williams Skill Development Camp, and the Emvipi Foundation Academy.

Since 2012, he has also worked at his camps and basketball clinics worldwide, in countries such as Spain, Senegal, Greece, South Africa, and at the annual summer Audie Norris Basketball Camp, which is held at L'Hospitalet de Llobregat, in Barcelona.

In 2014, Norris signed with the Spanish ACB League team CDB Sevilla, as an assistant coach. However, he was officially listed as the team's head coach, instead of Scott Roth, whose coaching license had not yet been processed by the Liga ACB. He was hired to coach the team's post players, two of whom later went on to play in the NBA: Kristaps Porziņģis and Willy Hernangómez.

In 2016, Norris took over as the head coach of the Jump10 Elite Training Camp, and he then served as the head coach of the Chinese team that was participating at the World Jump10 Hoops Challenge in Shanghai, where the team finished in 4th place. In September 2016, Norris worked for a month coaching the post players of the Chinese Basketball Association team Guangzhou Long-Lions. Two of those players were sent to the Spanish league team Movistar Estudiantes.

Personal life
Norris' older brother, Sylvester, is also a former NBA player. He played with the San Antonio Spurs.

References

External links

 
 NCAA statistics @ sports-reference.com
 FIBA Europe Player Profile
 Italian League Player Profile 
 Spanish League Archive Player Profile 
 Spanish League statistics 

1960 births
Living people
20th-century African-American sportspeople
21st-century African-American people
African-American basketball coaches
African-American basketball players
American expatriate basketball people in Greece
American expatriate basketball people in Italy
American expatriate basketball people in Spain
American men's basketball players
Basketball players from Jackson, Mississippi
Centers (basketball)
FC Barcelona Bàsquet players
Greek Basket League players
Jackson State Tigers basketball players
Liga ACB players
Pallacanestro Treviso players
Peristeri B.C. players
Portland Trail Blazers draft picks
Portland Trail Blazers players
Power forwards (basketball)
Sportspeople from Jackson, Mississippi